East Whittier City School District is a school district based in Whittier, California, United States.

EWCSD serves a large portion of the city of Whittier, and operates Elementary and Middle schools. The city's secondary schools are encompassed by the Whittier Union High School District.

Schools

Intermediate schools 

East Whittier Middle School
Granada Middle School
Hillview Middle School

Elementary schools 

Ceres Elementary School
Evergreen Elementary School
La Colima Elementary School
Laurel Elementary School
Leffingwell Elementary School
Mulberry Elementary School
Murphy Ranch Elementary School
Ocean View Elementary School
Orchard Dale Elementary School
Scott Avenue Elementary School
There are 556 student attending Scott Ave. 5% are Hispanic, 89% are white, 2% are African American, 2% are Asian, 2% are Filipino, less than one percent each of Pacific Islander and Alaska Native. The ADA of the school is $6,642.

References

External links 
 

School districts in Los Angeles County, California
Whittier, California